The 2014 Prince Edward Island Scotties Tournament of Hearts, the provincial women's curling championship for Prince Edward Island, was held from January 9 to 12 at the Charlottetown Curling Complex in Charlottetown. The winning team, skipped by Kim Dolan, represented Prince Edward Island at the 2014 Scotties Tournament of Hearts in Montreal.

Teams

Round-robin standings
Final round-robin standings

Round-robin results

Draw 1
Thursday, January 9, 2:00 pm

Draw 2
Thursday, January 9, 7:00 pm

Draw 3
Friday, January 10, 2:00 pm

Draw 4
Friday, January 10, 7:00 pm

Draw 5
Saturday, January 11, 2:00 pm

Playoffs

Semifinal
Saturday, January 11, 7:00 pm

Final
Sunday, January 12, 2:00 pm

External links
Official site

Prince Edward Island
Scotties Tournament of Hearts
Curling competitions in Charlottetown
Prince Edward Island Scotties Tournament of Hearts